Anomala kanshireiensis is a species of beetle in the family Scarabaeidae. It was described by Carsten Zorn and Ming-Zhi Zhao in 2022.

Etymology 
The species is named after the historical name of the type locality, Kanshirei.

Distribution 
This species can be found in Taiwan.

References 

Rutelinae
Beetles described in 2022